Tennis competitions at the 2023 Pan American Games in Santiago, Chile are scheduled to be held from October 23 to 29. The competitions will take place at the Racket Sports Center, in Ñuñoa.

A total of 82 athletes (41 men and 41 women) are scheduled to compete in five events: singles and doubles for each gender and a mixed doubles event.

The top two in each individual event will qualify for the 2024 Summer Olympics, if ranked in the top 400 in the world by June 10, 2024, and if their country has not passed the maximum quota.

Qualification

A total of 82 tennis players will qualify to compete at the Games (41 men and 41 women). Each country is allowed to enter a maximum of three male and three female athletes (with one pair maximum in each of the doubles events). The singles events will consist of 41 men and 41 women respectively, with those athletes competing in the doubles events. The host nation Chile was allowed to enter with a maximum team of 6 athletes, while the remaining spots were distributed using two regional Games and the ATP rankings, WTA rankings and ITF rankings. A further three wildcards for men and women will be also awarded.

Participating nations
A total of 22 countries had qualified athletes.

Medal summary

Medalists

See also
Tennis at the 2024 Summer Olympics

References

Tennis at the 2023 Pan American Games
Events at the 2023 Pan American Games
Pan American Games
2023